A Big House by the Lake is the fourth studio album by alternative rock band Cecimonster Vs. Donka from Lima, Peru.

Track listing

Personnel 
Band Members
 Sergio Saba – vocals, guitar
 Sebastian Kouri –  guitar
 Danny Wilson – bass guitar
 Mario Acuña – Drums

Additional personnel

 Rafael de la Lama – Recording, mixing
 Bruno Bellatin – Arrangements, guitars

References 

2019 albums
Cecimonster Vs. Donka albums